Étoile Football Club was a professional football club which was formed to play in Singapore's S.League in 2010 and is currently a local football academy focused on grassroots football development for the underprivileged. 

Étoile FC was the first team of players all born in Europe to play football in Singapore's professional league, and the first in Asia. The team was mostly made up of players of French origin. After pulling out of the S-League in 2012, Étoile FC was converted to a football academy based in Commonwealth, aiming to provide quality football coaching and development for individuals from all walks of life.

History

Étoile FC became the eighth team defined by foreign team composition to compete in the S.League after Sinchi FC (2003), Albirex Niigata (2004), Sporting Afrique (2006), Liaoning Guangyuan and Super Reds (both 2007), Dalian Shide Siwu FC (2008) and DPMM FC (2009).
Étoile FC's debut season was one for the team to remember as they were not only crowned champions of the Singapore League Cup, but also the Champions of the S-League and 3rd place in the Singapore Cup.

Étoile FC became the first foreign team to win the S-League following a 4–2 win over Albirex Niigata Singapore FC at Jurong East Stadium. On that fateful night, Kobayashi had scored twice to give the Japanese satellite team a 2–1 lead at half time. However, goals by Frédéric Mendy (2 goals) and Matthias Verschave sealed the title win for Étoile FC.

Étoile FC was the 'brainchild' of ex-Gombak United midfielder Johan Gouttefangeas. He was the chairman of Étoile FC since its formation in 2010. However, in June 2011, Johan relinquished his position as Chairman and Hicham Moudden took over.

Étoile FC pulled out of the S-League for the 2012 season to focus on grassroots football and youth development with the creation of Étoile FC Academy.

Étoile FC Academy bases itself on three core principles: Grassroots football is football for all, play is the best means of learning – above all, youngsters should have fun and children are not just miniature adults.

They were sponsored by Lufthansa Technik in 2017.

Players

First-team squad

Club Ambassador
Étoile FC had, on 22 March 2011, appointed Sidney Govou, as the club's ambassador. In the process, Étoile FC becomes the first S-League club to have an ambassador appointed to represent the club. Sidney and his brother, Jules, arrived in Singapore on 8 June 2011 and conducted a soccer clinic for children.

Honours
League
S.League: 2010

Cup
Singapore League Cup: 2010
Singapore Charity Shield: Runners-up 2011

Seasons

References

External links
 Official Website
 Etoile FC Academy
 Etoile FC Academy (Instagram)
 S.League.Com: Étoile FC and Beijing Guoan to play in S.League 2010
 TODAYonline.Com: Sports: "Voila, and the French are here"
 TODAYonline.Com: Sports: Get ready for some French flair
 ChannelNewsAsia.Com: France's Étoile FC named as 11th team for 2010 S.League season
 ChannelNewsAsia.Com: Football: French and Chinese team expected to add more buzz to S.League
 TheNewPaper: Bonjour, S-League
 AsiaOne.Com: French club Étoile one of two new S-League teams
 早报体育: 取代韩国超红和文莱DPMM 北京国安法国埃图瓦勒角逐新联赛
 法国球队加盟新联赛 国安预备队对抗欧洲力量_中国足球_体育_腾讯网
 Tempointeraktif.Com – Liga Singapura Sertakan Klub Eropa
 Reuters: French and Chinese sides enter Singapore league for 2010
 Kallangroar.com: Étoile FC
 Foot69: Singapore, a trampoline for the stars (French)

Foreign teams in Singapore football leagues
Expatriated football clubs
Singapore Premier League clubs